The A-League Coach of the Month is an association football award that recognises the best adjudged A-League manager each month of the season. The winner is chosen by a combination of an online public vote.

List of winners

Awards won by nationality

Awards won by club

References

A-League Men trophies and awards